WRC+ (also known as WRC plus) is the over-the-top official media service provider of the FIA World Rally Championship, provided by WRC Promoter GmbH, distributed digitally on connected TVs, smartphones, tablets, and on its website. It is available globally offering a subscription-based streaming service, with live coverage of each event of the World Rally Championship series, along with real-time GPS tracking, onboard videos of every rally, and 2.5 hours of on-demand highlights videos every rally event. Four languages are available for commentary.

Development
Since 2014, the WRC+ subscription OTT service was providing a couple of live stages per event, including the Power Stage at the end of each rally. With the introduction of WRC+ ALL Live in 2018, for the first time in the championship's history, every special stage from each round was shown as it happens, allowing the fans to follow the FIA World Rally Championship much better in 2018. The first rally that streamed all stages live was Rally Monte Carlo on January 25, 2018.

WRC plus service plans are divided into two price tiers; the lowest includes limited access to the live coverage and the highest, allows access to all live coverage produced during rally event. Both are available on a monthly or yearly basis.

In January 19th, 2019, WRC+ ALL LIVE, launched live coverage with live commentary in Spanish for all live stages. German and Japanese were available since the 2021 Croatia Rally.

Broadcasting

See also

List of World Rally Championship broadcasters
World Rally Radio

References

External links
 
 

2014 establishments in Germany
Sports mass media in Germany
World Rally Championship